Unterrath is one of the 50 quarters of the City of Düsseldorf,  Germany. Located in the north of the city, it is part of Borough 6. It is near Düsseldorf Airport.

Geography
It is bordering on Düsseldorf-Lohausen, Lichtenbroich, Rath, Mörsenbroich, Derendorf und Stockum.

Name and History
The royal court of the honschaft Rath was in Unterrath. In 1869, the Carthusians founded their first German convent in Unterrath. 
By its own wish, Unterrath became a part of Düsseldorf in 1909, together with Rath and Lichtenbroich.

Unterrath is mainly a housing area. Daimler automotive company has factories in Unterrath.

See also 
 Düsseldorf-Unterrath station

References 

Unterrath